George Hurst (20 May 1926 – 15 September 2012) was a British conductor.

Early life
Hurst was born in Edinburgh, Scotland, in 1926, of Romanian and Russian parentage. He became a piano student in London of Julius Isserlis, grandfather of the cellist Steven Isserlis.  On the outbreak of World War II, Hurst was sent to Canada, where he continued to study music at Bishop's College School in Lennoxville, Quebec and The Royal Conservatory of Music in Toronto, Ontario, Canada.

Career
Hurst began his career as a writer and then his talent for composition was recognized while he was a student at Royal Conservatory in Toronto, Ontario, Canada. At age 21, he became a professor of composition at the Peabody Institute located in Baltimore, and also worked and studied with Pierre Monteux while he stayed in America.  In North America, Hurst was affiliated with the York Symphony Orchestra (Pennsylvania) from 1950 to 1955.

Hurst acted as an associate conductor for the London Philharmonic Orchestra under Sir Adrian Boult in the early 1950s. He was the chief conductor of the BBC Northern Orchestra (later the BBC Philharmonic) from 1958 to 1968. In 1956, he took part in the London Philharmonic tour of Russia. His conducting work with the BBC Northern included the first Manchester performance of Arnold Schoenberg's Gurre-Lieder in February 1966, and also the premiere of Thomas Pitfield's Concerto lirico for violin and orchestra.

Hurst formed the Bournemouth Sinfonietta in 1968 and was their artistic adviser until 1974. With the Bournemouth Symphony Orchestra, he led the first London performance of the Second Symphony of Malcolm Williamson on 31 October 1969.  He was principal guest conductor of the BBC Scottish Symphony Orchestra from 1986 to 1989.  From 1990 to 1993, he was principal conductor of the RTE National Symphony Orchestra of Ireland.

From 1960, Hurst was affiliated as a teacher with the Sherborne Summer School of Music (formerly Canford Summer School of Music). He was also a visiting professor at the Royal Academy of Music in London, and conducted from 1983 until his death.

Recordings
Hurst's recordings include Wagner operatic orchestral extracts with the New Philharmonia, The Planets with the Bournemouth Symphony Orchestra, suites from King Arthur and Starlight Express by Elgar and English string music with the Bournemouth Sinfonietta, and Elgar's First Symphony with the BBC Philharmonic.

Personal life
Hurst was married twice.  His second wife Denise Ham, whom he married in 2007, survives him, as does his daughter from his first marriage.

References

External links
 Biography Royal Academy of Music

See also 
List of Bishop's College School alumni

Academics of the Royal Academy of Music
The Royal Conservatory of Music alumni
Bishop's College School alumni
Honorary Members of the Royal Academy of Music
1926 births
2012 deaths
English conductors (music)
British male conductors (music)
British people of Romanian descent
British people of Russian descent
Scottish people of Romanian descent